Gordon McIntyre (15 November 1989) is a Scottish international field hockey player who plays for Scotland and Great Britain.

He plays club hockey in the Men's England Hockey League for Wimbledon Hockey Club.

He competed for Scotland at the Commonwealth Games in Delhi 2010 and Glasgow 2014.

McIntyre made his Great Britain international debut on 17 October 2014.

References

1989 births
Living people
Wimbledon Hockey Club players
Scottish male field hockey players
British male field hockey players
Beeston Hockey Club players
Men's England Hockey League players
Field hockey players at the 2010 Commonwealth Games
Field hockey players at the 2014 Commonwealth Games
Commonwealth Games competitors for Scotland